Panchpota is a neighborhood of Garia, close to Kolkata, West Bengal, India. It is accessible from the Garia Station Road, Kolkata. It is located beside Garia railway station. Besides Narendrapur railway station also serves the area.

Among the town's features is the  Netaji Subhash Engineering College and College of Visual Art.

Transportation
You have to reach Garia Railway station and then take local transports like Auto Rickshaw, Cycle rickshaw. You can also take the train to Narendrapur Railway Station.

References

Neighbourhoods in Kolkata